Yellow & Elephant is the debut EP by American Alternative band Eye Alaska, released on June 17, 2008 through Fearless Records.

Track listing

References

2008 EPs